Big Boss or The Big Boss may refer to:

Films
 The Big Boss (1921 film), a German silent crime film
 The Big Boss (1941 film), a crime drama film with Gloria Dickson
 The Big Boss, a 1971 Hong Kong martial arts-action film starring Bruce Lee
 Big Boss (film), a 1995 Telugu film directed by Vijaya Bapineedu

Other uses
 Big Boss (Metal Gear), a central character from the Metal Gear video game series by Konami
 Big Boss (musician), Czech metal singer
 Big Boss (C.O.P.S.), from the C.O.P.S. (Central Organization of Police Specialists) toyline by Hasbro
 Tsuyoshi Shinjo, Japanese baseball manager also known as BIGBOSS

See also
 Big Boss Band, 1990 studio album of George Benson 
 Big Boss Man (disambiguation)
 Bigg Boss, an Indian reality TV show based on Big Brother
 Bigg Boss (Tamil TV series), a Tamil-language TV show based on Big Brother
 Boss (video games)